The Copenhagen Connection is a 1982 mystery novel by American writer Barbara Mertz published under the pseudonym Elizabeth Peters. It tells the story of American scholar Elizabeth Jones who during a sabbatical in Copenhagen, Denmark, meets her idol, brilliant Nobel Prize-Laureate Margaret Rosenberg in Copenhagen Airport and becomes her private assistant. Shortly after, Rosenberg  is kidnapped and Jones sets out to find her.

References

American mystery novels
1992 American novels
Novels set in Copenhagen
Works published under a pseudonym